Khalturin is a Russian masculine surname, its feminine counterpart is Khalturina. It may refer to
Marina Khalturina (born 1974), Soviet-Kazakhstani figure skater 
Stepan Khalturin (1856–1882), Russian revolutionary

Russian-language surnames